The Jodhpur boot is an ankle boot or Chelsea boot designed as a riding boot with a rounded toe and a low heel. They originally fastened with a strap and buckle, but today the term also includes designs with straps that do not wrap entirely around the ankle and the elastic-sided design without a strap also known as Chelsea boots.  A closely related riding boot design is called a paddock boot, particularly if modified to have a lace-up front. It is named after Jodhpur,  the second-largest city in the Indian state of Rajasthan.

History

Jodhpur boots originated in India in the 1920s, and were first worn by local polo riders. The wearing of Jodhpurs soon became a trend in the Western world, and Saks Fifth Avenue began selling them in as early as 1927. A Vogue article in that year, titled "A Habit for Informal Cross-Saddle Dressing", wrote that Jodhpur boots were "correct in every detail for summer shows" and meant to be complemented with a swagger stick and canary string gloves.

Fitting
The vamp is sewn on top of the quarters.  (A monk strap boot also fastens with a buckle, but the quarters are sewn on top of the vamp.)  The strap is typically in two parts, each attached to the vamp.  The buckle end is attached to the inboard side and extends halfway around the ankle, counterclockwise on the right boot.  The free end is attached to the outboard side and extends entirely around the ankle, clockwise on the right boot.  There is typically a loop sewn to the back of the boot that both strap ends can be passed through.

See also
 Jodhpurs
 R. M. Williams (company)
 Blundstone

References

External links

Rider apparel
Boots